The truncated pentakis dodecahedron is a convex polyhedron constructed as a truncation of the pentakis dodecahedron. It is Goldberg polyhedron GV(3,0), with pentagonal faces separated by an edge-direct distance of 3 steps.

Related polyhedra

It is in an infinite sequence of Goldberg polyhedra:

See also 
 Near-miss Johnson solid
 Truncated tetrakis cube

References

.
 Antoine Deza, Michel Deza, Viatcheslav Grishukhin, Fullerenes and coordination polyhedra versus half-cube embeddings, 1998 PDF

External links 
 VTML polyhedral generator Try "tkD" (Conway polyhedron notation)

Goldberg polyhedra